The 2015–16 Federation of Bosnia and Herzegovina Cup was the qualifying competition for the 2015–16 Bosnia and Herzegovina Football Cup.

Competition format
The competition was played in two stages, the Preliminary stage and the Final stage. Through the whole previous football season, each of the ten cantons in the Federation of Bosnia and Herzegovina had its own cup competition with the winners advancing to the Federation Cup Preliminary stage. Teams from the Second League of the Federation of Bosnia and Herzegovina (third level) and the lower leagues took part in the canton cups, while teams from the First League of the Federation of Bosnia and Herzegovina did not enter the canton cups, but relegated teams from the 2014–15 First League of FBiH season had the opportunity to qualify to the Federation cup in a playoff against the best team from their respective canton cup. The playoff had to be completed before 1 August 2015.

The Preliminary stage was divided into two groups of five teams each and consisted of two rounds, the First preliminary round and the Second preliminary round. In the First preliminary round four teams in each group were drawn into two matches and the winners advanced to the next round along with one team given a bye to the next round. The Second preliminary round saw three teams in each group with two teams drawn into one match and one team given a bye to the Final stage - no team could have been given byes in both rounds. The byed team was joined by the winner of the Second preliminary round match.

Group North was consisted of the next cantons: Posavina, Tuzla, Zenica-Doboj, Sarajevo and Bosnian-Podrinje.

Group South was consisted of the next cantons: Herzegovina-Neretva, Canton 10, West Herzegovina, Una-Sana and Central Bosnia.

The Final stage was consisted of 20 teams - four teams from the Preliminary stage and 16 teams from the First League of the Federation of Bosnia and Herzegovina. They were drawn into 10 matches with winners advancing to the 2015–16 Bosnia and Herzegovina Football Cup.

Canton cups

Una-Sana Canton
Statistics is shown in table below:

First round
Played on 21 and 22 March 2015

Mladost and Bratstvo failed to show up to game, Una NP and Vitez received a bye to next round respectively

Second round
Played on 8 April 2015

Una NP failed to show up to game, Brekovica 78 received a bye to next round

Third round
Played on 22 April 2015

Krajina Cazin bye to next round

Fourth round
Played on 6 May 2015

Brekovica 78 bye to next round

Final
Played on 20 May 2015; in Pjanići (neutral ground)

Posavina Canton
Statistics is shown in table below:

Tuzla Canton
Statistics is shown in table below:

First round
Played on 22 April 2015

Rudar forfeited

Second round
Played on 6 May 2015

Second round
Played on 19 and 20 May 2015

Zenica-Doboj Canton
Statistics is shown in table below:

First round
Played on 6 May 2015

Gradina and Borac failed to show up to game, Napredak and Kosmos received bye to next round respectively

Second round
Played on 13 May 2015

Krivaja and Stupčanica forfeited, Rudar and Rudar received a bye to next round respectively

Quarter final
Played on 20 May 2015

Rudar Zenica bye to next round
Rudar Breza forfeited, Bosna received a bye to next round

Semi final
Played on 3 June 2015

Bosna forfeited

Final
Played on 9 June 2015

Bosnian-Podrinje Canton
Statistics is shown in table below:

Central Bosnia Canton
Statistics is shown in table below:

First round
Played on 20 May 2015

Herzegovina-Neretva Canton
Statistics is shown in table below:

West Herzegovina Canton
Statistics is shown in table below:

Sarajevo Canton
Statistics is shown in table below:

First round
Played on 13 May 2015

Canton 10
Statistics is shown in table below:

Combined statistics
As of 13 May 2015

Federation of Bosnia and Herzegovina Cup
Statistics is shown in table below:

External links
Official site for the Football Federation of the Federation of Bosnia and Herzegovina

2015–16 in Bosnia and Herzegovina football